Rhysocara crassa is a species of beetle in the family Carabidae, the only species in the genus Rhysocara.

References

Scaritinae